"Nada" (English: "Nothing") is a song by Colombian singer and songwriter Shakira released as a promotional single on 19 May 2017 and as the eighth official single from El Dorado on 3 November 2018.  Its lyrics were written by Shakira. Its musical composition was done by Shakira and her longtime collaborator Luis Fernando Ochoa.

Release
The song was originally released as a promotional single for "El Dorado" in 2017 just before the album's release. The song was well received by both critics and fans who applauded Shakira for returning to her 90s rock ballad roots. It was officially released as a single in November 3, 2018 and it was considered to be an "Epic house ballad".

Music video
The official music video for the song was released on 3 November 2018 for the final night of her El Dorado World Tour. The video premiered during a show in Bogota, Colombia and was then uploaded to YouTube after the show.

Charts

Weekly charts

Year-end charts

References

2017 songs
Songs written by Luis Fernando Ochoa
Songs written by Shakira
Shakira songs
Pop ballads